Hewett is a suburb north of Gawler in South Australia.

References

 Suburbs of Adelaide